Presidential elections were held in Ecuador on 10 October 1975, following the assassination of Gabriel García Moreno, who had been elected president in May. The result was a victory for Antonio Borrero, who received 86% of the vote. He took office on 9 December.

Results

References

1875 10
Ecuador
1875 in Ecuador
1875